Big Electric Metal Bass Face is the second studio album by Die Warzau, released on October 1, 1991 by Atlantic and Fiction Records. The band introduced elements of funk music and the speeches of American politicians into their sample library to musically articulate topics concerning race relations such as "Funkopolis". Percussionist Chris Vrenna, who had performed on Nine Inch Nails' 1989 debut Pretty Hate Machine, joined the band to collaborate on tour and to record in studio.

Reception

Tim Griggs of AllMusic gave Big Electric Metal Bass Face a mostly negative review and called the songs "not as heavy as other industrial recordings; in fact, considering the name of the band and album title, some are wimpier than they should be." Ben Thompson of The Wire was also critical of the album and said "the single 'Funkopolis' is something of a toe-tapper but much of the rest steers perilously close to the little-lamented early 80s college-educated tribal funk essays of Shriekback et al."

A critic at Keyboard was more positive in their review, identifying the band's strength at rhythm arrangements and saying "their mixes are unusually bright: Samples punch, synth saxes honk, Moogish bass lines go yowp-yowp, drums thump, unidentified noises circle and take off, all of them clear and sharp." Mondo 2000 praised the band for developing a jazzy and more quiet and kinetic energy, describing the album as "a dance - till - it - hurts mutant blend of industrial, rap, funk, and house." Similarly, CMJ claimed that the album "not only avoids cliche but manages to evoke a fluid R&B feel throughout."

In comparing the album to Disco Rigido, Tony Fletcher of Trouser Press called "stronger and smarter, a worthy blending of funky rock, chanted vocals, spoken-word samples and proto-electronica" and compared the band favorably to Red Hot Chili Peppers.

Track listing

Personnel
Adapted from the Big Electric Metal Bass Face liner notes.

Die Warzau
 Van Christie (as The Atomic Cowboy) – guitar, keyboards, sampler, programming, production, engineering, mixing
 Jim Marcus – lead vocals, drums, percussion, electronics, horns, production, mixing, design

Additional performers
 Dave Andrew (as The White Guy) – additional percussion
 Burle Avant (as DJ (Durpilicious)) – turntables, additional vocals, backing vocals
 Chris Bruce – bass guitar
 Jim Romano (as Cheese) – additional vocals
 Tom Stranich (as Wolverine) – additional vocals
 Tim Titsworth (as Happy Titsworth) – additional vocals
 Chris Vrenna (as Pooboy) – additional percussion
 Jennifer Wilcox (as Levi) – additional vocals
 James Woolley (as Bear) – percussion, additional keyboards, backing vocals

Production and design
 Tom Coyne – mastering
 Steve Manno – mixing
 Mike Rogers – mixing
 Steve Spapperi – additional engineering

Release history

References

External links 
 

1991 albums
Die Warzau albums
Atlantic Records albums
Fiction Records albums